Henny is a Scandinavian and Dutch male and female first name, nickname and surname. It may refer to:

Female given name
 Henny Backus (1911–2004), Broadway showgirl in the 1930s
 Henny Lindorff Buckhøj (1902–1979), Danish film actress
 Henny Koch (1854–1925), German  children's author
 Henny Lauritzen (1871–1938), Danish stage and film actress of the silent era
 Henny Moan (born 1936), Norwegian actress from Finnmark
 Henny Mürer (1925–1997), Norwegian choreographer and dancer
 Henny Skjønberg (1886–1973), Norwegian actress and stage director

Male given name
 Henny Eman, first Prime Minister of Aruba, from 1986 to 1989
 Henny Eman (AVP founder), grandfather of the Aruba Prime Minister
 Henny Meijer (born 1962), Dutch former football player
 Henny Schilder 1984) is a Dutch football player who plays as a centre back for FC Volendam
 Henny Vrienten (born 1948), Dutch composer, singer, songwriter and musician
 Henny ter Weer (1922–2013),  Dutch fencer

Nickname
 Hendrikje van Andel-Schipper (1890–2005), Dutch supercentenarian and longest-lived Dutch person in history
 Henny Dons (1874–1966), Norwegian educator and missionary
 La Jana (actress), Austro-German dancer and actress Henriette Margarethe ("Henny") Hiebel (1905–1940)
 Henny Porten (1890–1960), German actress and film producer of the silent era
 Henny Scholtz (born 1911), Dutch sailor at the 1964 Summer Olympics
 Henny Vegter (born 1958), Dutch sailor at the 1988 Olympics
 Henny Youngman (1906–1998), British-born American comedian

Family name

  Leonard M. Henny (1935–2011), Dutch filmmaker, teacher and writer
  Phil Henny (born 1943) Swiss racing mechanic, driver and author
  Victor Henny (1887–1941), Dutch sprinter

See also
 Henny Street, Great Henny and Little Henny, villages in Essex, England
 Hennie, a list of people with the given name, nickname or surname
 Henie, a list of people with the surname
 Hennessy, a brand of cognac, commonly referred to as "Henny" in rap songs.

Lists of people by nickname
Unisex given names